The 2019–20 season was F.C. Copenhagen's 28th season of existence, competing each year in the 3F Superliga, the top tier of football in Denmark. In addition to the 3F Superliga, Copenhagen advanced to the quarterfinals of the Sydbank Pokalen, the UEFA Europa League and advanced to the Third Qualifying Round of the 2019–20 UEFA Champions League. The season was interrupted by the COVID-19 pandemic, and matches were stopped after matches on March 8 and resumed on May 28.

Squad

Transfers and loans 
From July 1, 2019.  Arrivals include players returning from loans.  Departures include players out on loan.

Arrivals

Summer

Winter

Departures

Summer

Winter

Non-competitive

Pre-season Friendlies

Winter Friendlies

Spring Friendlies (COVID-19 Restart)

Competitive

Competition record

Superliga

Regular season

Championship Round

Matches

Sydbank Pokalen

Danish Cup Matches

UEFA Champions League

Second qualifying round

Third qualifying round

UEFA Europa League

Playoff round

Group stage

Group B

Knockout phase

Round of 32

Round of 16

Quarter-finals

Statistics

Appearances 

This includes all competitive matches and refers to all squad members playing throughout the season, regardless of their current roster status.

Goalscorers 

This includes all competitive matches.

Assists 

This includes all competitive matches.

Clean Sheets 

This includes all competitive matches.

Disciplinary record 

This includes all competitive matches.

Awards

Team

Individual

References 

Danish football clubs 2019–20 season
F.C. Copenhagen seasons